Jeffrey Dahmer (1960–1994) was an American serial killer and sex offender charged with 17 counts of murder and sentenced to 941 years.

Dahmer may also refer to:

 Dahmer, West Virginia,  an unincorporated community in the U.S.
 Dahmer (surname), including a list of people with the surname
 Dahmer (film), a 2002 American biographical true-crime horror film about Jeffrey Dahmer 
 Dahmer (album), a 2000 concept album by Macabre about Jeffrey Dahmer
 Dahmer – Monster: The Jeffrey Dahmer Story, a 2022 American limited series about Jeffrey Dahmer

See also

 Dammer (disambiguation)
 Dammers (disambiguation)